Marlies Janssens (born 4 June 1997) is a Belgian volleyball player. She is part of the Belgium women's national volleyball team.

She competed at the 2017 FIVB Volleyball World Grand Prix. 
On club level she plays for VC Oudegem.

Clubs

References

External links 
 Player profile FIVB
 Player profile, CEV
 

1997 births
Living people
Belgian women's volleyball players
Place of birth missing (living people)
Middle blockers
21st-century Belgian women